Perception of Reality was the 4th studio album by hard rock band Takara released in 2001 on Lion Music & Saraya Recordings. It is their first album without vocalist Jeff Scott Soto.

Track listing
 "Miles Away"
 "Shadows In The Night"
 "Tomorrow"
 "Without You"
 "Ready To Promise"
 "L.I.E.S."
 "Dream Of It All"
 "Believe"
 "Tell Me"

Personnel
Michael J Flatters – lead vocals
Neal Grusky – guitar
Carl Demarco – bass
Brook Hansen – keyboards
Chad Clark – drums

References
 Official Website

2001 albums
Takara (band) albums